The Royal Canadian Artillery Museum, Canada's National Artillery Museum, is a museum dedicated to telling the complete story of more than 200,000 Canadian Gunners who have served Canada in war and peace since 1855. Canada's National Artillery Museum is a Manitoba Star Attraction and one of the largest military museums in Canada.The Royal Regiment of Canadian Artillery (RCA) has been a part of the fabric of Canadian history since the earliest days of the country. In 1962, the RCA Museum was established at Canadian Forces Base Shilo in order to preserve and interpret this proud heritage for future generations.

Exhibits 
The exhibition facility is 24,000 square feet, including more than 12,000 square feet of indoor exhibits encompassing five major galleries, with numerous interactive exhibits and videos. The National Artillery Gallery is the largest exhibit and features 28 artillery pieces and vehicles telling the story of the Canadian Gunner.

Canadian military history is on display in the Canadian Forces Heritage Gallery. The Weapons Vault right next door displays almost 100 pistols and rifles. The Glorious and Free gallery tells the story of Manitoba's 12,000 years of military history. The Manitoba Hall of Honour pays tribute to the thirteen Manitobans who have received the Victoria Cross (two original Victoria Crosses are on display) as well as honouring those Manitobans who have sacrificed their lives for Canada.

The RCA Museum also features an outdoor "Gun Park" with more than thirty artillery pieces and vehicles.  It runs two temporary exhibits each year in the Gregg Gallery to ensure that there is always something new for returning visitors.

Facilities 
Fully accessible for people with disabilities. Guests are welcome to take pictures and guided tours can be booked in advance. The museum is located on Canadian Forces Base Shilo (Building N-118, Patricia Road, CFB Shilo) only 27 km east of Brandon, Manitoba, south of the Trans-Canada Highway.
Military and war museums in Canada